Thomas van den Balck (born 31 August 1982) is a Belgian field hockey player. He competed in the men's tournament at the 2008 Summer Olympics.

References

External links
 

1982 births
Living people
Belgian male field hockey players
Olympic field hockey players of Belgium
Field hockey players at the 2008 Summer Olympics
People from Uccle
Field hockey players from Brussels
2002 Men's Hockey World Cup players